The Slovenia women's national under-16 basketball team is a national basketball team of Slovenia, administered by the Basketball Federation of Slovenia. It represents the country in women's international under-16 basketball competitions.

Tournament record

World Cup

European Championship

See also
Slovenia women's national basketball team
Slovenia women's national under-18 basketball team
Slovenia men's national under-16 basketball team

References

External links

Archived records of Slovenia team participations

Basketball
Women's national under-16 basketball teams